The Waverly Downtown Historic District is a national historic district located at Waverly, Sussex County, Virginia.  The district encompasses 48 contributing buildings, 1 contributing site, and 2 contributing structures in the central business district of Waverly.  The buildings represent a variety of popular architectural styles including Folk Victorian and Italianate.  They include residential, commercial, governmental, and institutional buildings dating from the mid-19th to mid-20th centuries.  Notable buildings include the Waverly Municipal Hall (c. 1880), Atlantic and Danville Railroad Station (c. 1883), Masonic Lodge/Town Hall (c. 1897), Boarding House (c. 1900), Moss Hardware Building (c. 1915), Fleetwood Building (1904), Warner Grammer Store (c. 1904), Wilcox Building (c. 1904), former Waverly Post Office/ Palace Cigar and Pool Room (1961), and Waverly Town Shops and Water Tower (1932).

It was listed on the National Register of Historic Places in 2013.

References

Historic districts on the National Register of Historic Places in Virginia
Italianate architecture in Virginia
Victorian architecture in Virginia
Buildings and structures in Sussex County, Virginia
National Register of Historic Places in Sussex County, Virginia